Ain't No Mountain High Enough: A Tribute to Hitsville U.S.A. is the 22nd studio album by Michael Bolton. It features recordings of songs originally made famous by various artists during the Motown era. It became his highest charting studio album in the US since 2002.

Track listing 
 "Ain't No Mountain High Enough" (featuring Leona Lewis) – 2:49
 "How Sweet It Is (To Be Loved by You)" – 3:13
 "Ain't Nothing Like the Real Thing" (featuring Melanie Fiona) – 2:36
 "Gotta Keep Dreaming" – 4:33
 "Nowhere to Run"  – 3:03
 "The Way You Do the Things You Do" – 3:10
 "You Keep Me Hangin' On" – 3:07
 "What's Going On" (featuring Michael Lington) – 3:29
 "Tracks of My Tears" – 3:59
 "Signed, Sealed, Delivered (I'm Yours)" – 2:51

Charts

References 

2013 albums
Michael Bolton albums
Tribute albums